Sape Wamane railway station is a halt station on Konkan Railway. It is at a distance of  down from origin at Roha station. The preceding station on the line is Veer railway station and the next station is Karanjadi railway station.

References

Railway stations along Konkan Railway line
Railway stations in Raigad district
Ratnagiri railway division